is a 1963 Japanese satirical comedy film directed by Kihachi Okamoto and based on the Naoki Prize winning novel by Hitomi Yamaguchi.

Plot
Eburi, an advertising department employee, promises two women's magazine editors to write a masterpiece of a magazine article while drunk. Once he sobers up, he decides to write an article using his own life and his family's history as a basis. Addressing his father's profiteering during the Pacific War, Eburi reflects upon postwar Japan and the legacy of the militarist regime. After winning the Naoki Prize, he gets drunk with two colleagues, lamenting the fate of the many young men who had been seduced to go to war and died.

Cast
 Keiju Kobayashi as Eburi
 Michiyo Aratama as Natsuko, his wife
 Eijirō Tōno as Meiji, his father
 Yuriko Hanabusa as Miyo, his mother
 Tatsuyoshi Ehara as Hane, his neighbor

Production
The film was originally supposed to be directed by Yūzō Kawashima, but the job was passed on to Okamoto when Kawashima died.

Legacy
Keiju Kobayashi won the best actor award at the Mainichi Film Awards for his performance in this film and in Pressure of Guilt.

The film was featured at the 2007 Berlin Film Festival as part of its Okamoto retrospective. The catalog wrote: "This masterpiece, overflowing with wisdom, represents the 'Kihachi touch'." The Japan Foundation also selected the film as part of its 2019 touring film program, stating that "Featuring animation and audacious editing, this idiosyncratic and inventive film is a timeless treatment of life in postwar Japan." A 35mm film print of the film is preserved in the collection of the National Film Archive of Japan.

References

Bibliography

External links
 
 

1963 films
1963 comedy films
Japanese comedy films
1960s Japanese-language films
Films based on Japanese novels
Films directed by Kihachi Okamoto
Toho films
1960s Japanese films